Pacasmayo District is one of five districts of the province Pacasmayo in Peru. It lies just over 100 km north of Trujillo, in km number 681 from the Panamerican Highway, is located in the coast beside to the Pacific Ocean. The city is visited commonly for surfers.

References